"The Sound of Silence" is a 1965 song by Simon and Garfunkel, covered by Disturbed in 2015.

The Sound of Silence or Sounds of Silence may also refer to:

Films
 Sounds of Silence (2006 film), a documentary about music in Iran
 Sound of Silence (2017 film), an Indian film
 The Sound of Silence (2019 film), an American drama

Music 
 Sounds of Silence, a 1966 album by Simon & Garfunkel
 The Sound of Silence (album), 1968 album by Carmen McRae
 4′33″,  a three-movement composition by American experimental composer John Cage, also known as The Sounds of Silence
 "Sound of Silence" (Dami Im song), Australia's entry at the Eurovision Song Contest 2016

Television 
 "Sounds of Silence" (CSI episode), the twentieth episode of the first season of CSI: Crime Scene Investigation
 "The Sound of Silence" (Grey's Anatomy), the ninth episode of the twelfth season of Grey's Anatomy
 "Sound of Silence", an episode of ''The Loud House
 "Sounds of Silence", the twenty-third episode of the eighth season of My Little Pony: Friendship Is Magic

See also
 The Sound of Music (disambiguation)